Norm Thompson (born 15 June 1933) is  a former Australian rules footballer who played with Footscray and St Kilda in the Victorian Football League (VFL).

Notes

External links 		
		
		
		
		
		
		
Living people		
1933 births		
		
Australian rules footballers from Victoria (Australia)		
Western Bulldogs players		
St Kilda Football Club players
Box Hill Football Club players